Bolwarra is a small town near the coast with a population of 601 as counted at the 2016 Census. The Bolwarra post office opened in 1902 and closed in 1971.

Reference List

Towns in Victoria (Australia)